Dandagaun may refer to the following places in Nepal:

Dandagaun, Bagmati
Dandagaun, Jajarkot
Dandagaun, Kosi
Dandagaun, Rapti
Dandagaun, Rasuwa
Dandagaun, Sagarmatha